Rapper Nicki Minaj has released four studio albums, one compilation album, three mixtapes, 123 singles (including 80 as a featured artist), and 20 promotional singles.

After becoming involved with music and acting in high school in New York City, Minaj eventually picked up rapping. She was discovered by American rapper Lil Wayne and signed to Young Money Entertainment—a subdivision of Cash Money Records with distribution through Republic Records—in 2009. Minaj's first solo single, "Your Love", peaked at number 14 on the US Billboard Hot 100 and topped the Billboard Hot Rap Songs chart, an achievement that made Minaj the first female artist to top the chart as a solo artist since 2002. Her next three singles, "Check It Out", "Right Thru Me" and "Moment 4 Life", all peaked within the top 40 on the Hot 100. Minaj's debut studio album, Pink Friday, was released in November 2010, topping the US Billboard 200 and has since been certified triple platinum by the Recording Industry Association of America (RIAA). The album's fifth single, "Super Bass", reached the top ten in multiple countries, including the US where it peaked at number three and has since been certified Diamond by the RIAA for selling over 10 million units in the country.

Minaj's second studio album, Pink Friday: Roman Reloaded (2012), debuted at number one on the Billboard 200. The album also entered the UK Albums Chart at number one, making Minaj the highest-charting female rapper on the UK charts. The album's lead single, "Starships", peaked at number five on the Hot 100 and reached the top ten in multiple other countries. An expanded version of Pink Friday: Roman Reloaded subtitled, The Re-Up, was released in November 2012. Minaj's third studio album, The Pinkprint (2014), debuted at number two on the Billboard 200. The album's second single, "Anaconda", peaked at number two on the Hot 100 while further singles, "Only" and "Truffle Butter", peaked within the top 20 on the chart. In 2014, Minaj shared lead credit on the single "Bang Bang" with Jessie J and Ariana Grande. The song scored Minaj her first number one in the UK and peaked at number three in the US. Minaj's fourth studio album, Queen (2018), debuted at number two on the Billboard 200 and was certified platinum by the RIAA.

In 2020, Minaj scored her first number-one single on the Hot 100 after featuring on the remix of Doja Cat's "Say So"; marking the first collaboration between two female rap artists to top the chart. That same year, her collaboration with 6ix9ine on the song "Trollz" debuted at number one on the Hot 100; making Minaj the second female rapper to debut atop the Hot 100, and earning Minaj her first number-one single as a lead artist. Minaj's single "Super Freaky Girl" from her upcoming fifth studio album debuted at number one on the Hot 100, becoming the first solo song by a female rap artist to do so since 1998, and earning Minaj her third overall number-one single in the US.

Since 2010, Minaj has accumulated 126 chart entries on the Hot 100 (including featured credits) and has scored 21 top ten singles in her career, giving her the most among female rappers. Minaj has sold over 100 million records worldwide, making her the best-selling female rapper of all time. She was ranked by Billboard as the seventh overall Top Female Artist of any genre for the 2010s decade. According to the RIAA, Minaj has 34.5 million certified digital singles in the US.

Albums

Studio albums

Reissued albums

Compilation albums

Mixtapes

Singles

As lead artist

As featured artist

Promotional singles

Other charted songs

Guest appearances

See also
 Nicki Minaj videography
 List of songs recorded by Nicki Minaj
 List of artists who reached number one on the UK Singles Chart
 List of artists who reached number one in the United States

Notes

References

External links
 Official website
 Nicki Minaj at AllMusic
 
 

Discography
Hip hop discographies
Rhythm and blues discographies
Pop music discographies
Discographies of Trinidadian artists